is Do As Infinity's seventeenth single, released in 2003. It was used in the drama Koibumi: Watashitachi ga Aishite Otoko.

This song was included in the band's compilation album Do the A-side.

Track listing
 
 
  (Instrumental)
  (Instrumental)

Chart positions

External links
 "Hiiragi" at Avex Network
 "Hiiragi" at Oricon

2003 singles
Do As Infinity songs
Songs written by Dai Nagao
Japanese television drama theme songs
Song recordings produced by Seiji Kameda
2003 songs